The Dinnieh fighting (30 December 1999 – 6 January 2000) involved the Islamist group Takfir wa al-Hijra and the Lebanese Army fighting for eight days in the mountainous Dinnieh region, east of the northern Lebanese port of Tripoli.

Over a period of several days, an estimated 13,000 Lebanese army troops backed by tanks and artillery swiftly defeated the group of 200–300 rebels, driving isolated bands of surviving guerrillas into remote areas of north Lebanon. The Lebanese army reported a total of 12 soldiers killed in action, while 25 rebels were killed and 55 captured.

Group
The Dinniyeh Group was a group of 200–300 Islamist militants led by Bassam Ahmad Kanj. Kanj was a close associate of Raed Hijazi who had recently been indicted for his involvement in the millennium bombing plots in Jordan.

Attack
Starting at the close of December 1999, The Dinniyeh Group launched an attempt to create an Islamist mini-state in northern Lebanon. The militants seized control of dozens of villages in the mountainous Dinniyeh district, east of Tripoli before being defeated by a force of 13,000 Lebanese soldiers in several days of intense combat.

Aftermath
After the fighting members of The Dinniyeh Group who were not killed or captured fled to Ain al-Hilweh. According to court documents from judicial proceedings against captured members, the group had received financial support from associates of Osama bin Laden through bank accounts in Beirut and north Lebanon. In 2005, members of the group were released by a parliamentary resolution after the 2005 elections which also pardoned the most powerful anti-Syrian Christian leader Samir Geagea who was imprisoned 11 years earlier after being accused of involvement in the Saydet al-Najat Church Explosion (Lebanon, 1994)

References 

Lebanese Army Operations
Operations involving Lebanese special forces
Conflicts in 1999
Conflicts in 2000
Wars involving Lebanon
1999 in Lebanon
2000 in Lebanon
2000 millennium attack plots
Islamic terrorist incidents in 1999
Islamic terrorist incidents in 2000
Terrorist incidents in Lebanon in 1999
Terrorist incidents in Lebanon in 2000